Peace Valley Evangelical Church and Cemetery is a historic church in Harding County, South Dakota. It was built in a Gothic style in c.1900 and was added to the National Register of Historic Places in 1987.

It is located on the east side of South Dakota Highway 79 about eight miles northwest of Ralph, South Dakota.

References

External links
 

Churches on the National Register of Historic Places in South Dakota
Gothic Revival church buildings in South Dakota
Churches completed in 1900
Churches in Harding County, South Dakota
National Register of Historic Places in Harding County, South Dakota
Cemeteries on the National Register of Historic Places in South Dakota